Eupteryx melissae, known generally as the sage leafhopper or banded sage hopper, is a species of leafhopper in the family Cicadellidae.

References

Further reading

 
 

Insects described in 1837
Typhlocybini